Miguel Ángel López Díaz (born January 8, 1958) is a Mexican retired professional wrestler and trainer, better known by his ring name, Rey Misterio ("Mystery King"). He is also referred to as Rey Misterio Sr. to distinguish him from his nephew.

Professional wrestling career
Misterio first began training to be a boxer, but after his body got bigger, he took a lot of bumps and lost some of his punching ability. When his trainers told him that he could still punch hard, they told Misterio about wrestling. His brother soon began to take him to train for wrestling and lucha libre. On the sixth of January 1976, Misterio finally made his debut as a wrestler on a show called "Day of the Kings", or Día de los Reyes.

Misterio appeared at World Championship Wrestling's Starrcade 1990 pay-per-view event where he teamed with Konnan and competed in the "Pat O'Connor Memorial International Cup" representing Mexico. In the first round the team defeated Chris Adams and Norman Smiley representing the United Kingdom, but lost to The Steiner Brothers in the second round.

Training
In 1987, Misterio opened a gym with Negro Casas and Super Astro. His first class included future international superstars such as Konnan, Psicosis, Halloween, Damian 666 and his nephew Rey Mysterio Jr. Misterio is also known to have trained wrestlers such as Cassandro, Eiji Ezaki, Extassis, Extreme Tiger, Fobia, Misterioso, Pequeño Damián 666, Ruby Gardenia, The Warlord, and Venum Black.

Personal life
Misterio's son is also a wrestler,
who wrestles under the name El Hijo de Rey Misterio. Misterio is also the uncle of wrestlers Rey Mysterio and Metalika, great uncle to Dominik Mysterio and brother-in-law to Super Astro. He is featured in the horror film El Mascarado Massacre (or Wrestlemaniac).

Championships and accomplishments
Asistencia Asesoría y Administración
IWC World Middleweight Championship (2 times)
Pro Wrestling Illustrated
PWI ranked him #373 of the 500 best singles wrestlers during the PWI Years in 2003
PWI ranked him #212 of the 500 best singles wrestlers of the PWI 500 in 2004
Pro Wrestling Revolution
Revolution Tag Team Championship (1 time)- with El Hijo de Rey Misterio
Tijuana Wrestling
America's Championship (1 time)
Baja California Middleweight Championship (1 time)
IWC Television Championship (1 time)
Tijuana Welterweight Championship
Tijuana Tag Team Championship (3 times) – Saeta Oriental (1), Pequeño Apolo / Super Astro (1) and Rey Guerrero (1)
World Wrestling Association
WWA World Junior Light Heavyweight Championship (1 time)
WWA Tag Team Championship (1 time) – with Rey Mysterio Jr.
World Wrestling Organization
WWO World Championship (1 time)
Xtreme Latin American Wrestling
XLAW Extreme Championship (2 times)
Other accomplishments
 Tijuana Sports Hall of Fame (Class of 2006)

Luchas de Apuestas record

Footnotes

References

External links
 

1958 births
Living people
Masked wrestlers
Mexican male professional wrestlers
People from Tijuana
Professional wrestlers from Baja California